Karina Habšudová (born 2 August 1973) is a Slovak former professional tennis player. She has been ranked as high as 10 in the world (1997). Together with Karol Kučera, she won the Hopman Cup in 1998. Her best performance at a Grand Slam tournament came when she got to the quarterfinals of the 1996 French Open, defeating Kristin Godridge, Nathalie Tauziat, Martina Hingis, and Anke Huber before losing to Arantxa Sánchez Vicario, 8–10 in the third set.

She also had a successful junior career. She won the girls' singles at the 1991 US Open, and was junior No. 1 for some time.

Biography
Born in Bojnice, Czechoslovakia, Habšudová originally trained as a gymnast but at the age of ten, she switched to tennis under the encouragement of her mother, herself a former amateur tennis player. By the age of fourteen, she had already become the top junior player in Czechoslovakia. In 1990, she was crowned ITF Junior World Champion, and the following year she won the girls' singles title at the US Open.

As a professional, she made the fourth round of the 1991 Australian Open while still a schoolgirl, but her early promise was curtailed by health problems and injuries, including a bout of pneumonia in 1993 and an ankle injury the following year. After suffering another injury just as she had made it to the top 30 in the spring of 1995, she bounced back to enjoy her most successful year in 1996, where she had results such as reaching the final of the German Open and the quarterfinals of the French Open. At the latter event, she beat Martina Hingis and Anke Huber and served for a place in the semifinals against Arantxa Sánchez Vicario, but ultimately lost 8–10 in the third set.

Habšudová eventually broke the top 10 in early 1997, after reaching the final of the Generali Ladies Linz, becoming the first woman representing Slovakia to do so. Though she continued to play on the tour until 2003, she never again matched the same success of her breakthrough season, with later highlights including winning the Hopman Cup in 1998 and her only WTA singles title at the Austrian Open in 1999. In 2001, she reached the semifinals of the Wimbledon mixed doubles tournament partnering David Rikl.

Following her retirement, she worked for several years as a sports editor. She married her husband Milan Cílek in 2003 and they have three children together.

WTA career finals

Singles: 5 (1 title, 4 runner-ups)

Doubles: 12 (6 titles, 6 runner-ups)

ITF Circuit finals

Singles: 11 (6–5)

Doubles: 3 (3–0)

Head-to-head record against top 10 players
Players who have been ranked world No. 1 are in boldface.

 Dominique Monami 4–1
 Nadia Petrova 0–2
Venus Williams 0–1
Martina Hingis 4–3
 Elena Dementieva 0–3
 Steffi Graf 0–4
 Monica Seles 0–2
 Justine Henin 0–1
 Arantxa Sánchez Vicario 1–6
 Patty Schnyder 1–3
 Ai Sugiyama 1–2
Amélie Mauresmo 0–1
 Conchita Martínez 2–6
Kim Clijsters 1–0

References

External links
 
 
 
 
 
 

1973 births
Hopman Cup competitors
Living people
Sportspeople from Bojnice
Slovak female tennis players
Olympic tennis players of Slovakia
Tennis players at the 1996 Summer Olympics
Tennis players at the 2000 Summer Olympics
Wimbledon junior champions
US Open (tennis) junior champions
Grand Slam (tennis) champions in girls' singles
Grand Slam (tennis) champions in girls' doubles
Czechoslovak female tennis players